Rear Admiral Sumardjono (born June 12, 1951 in Yogyakarta, Indonesia) was the Chief of Naval Staff of the Republic of Indonesia from November 7, 2007 to July 1, 2008 replacing TNI Admiral Slamet Soebijanto.

References 

1951 births
Living people
People from Yogyakarta